Paul Clark is a musician who was involved in the Jesus music movement and early contemporary Christian music industry. He was born in Kansas City and recorded his first album in 1971, Songs from the Saviour Vol 1. Its songs became one of the first signs of the growing "Jesus movement" of the early 70s.

He went on to record further albums including Songs from the Savior - Volume Two, Come Into His Presence and Good To Be Home with Paul Clark and Friends (including Phil Keaggy, Jay Truax, John Mehler, Bill Speer, Mike Burhart, and more), then launched the well received, award-winning 1977 album Hand to the Plow. In 1978 he followed up with Change in the Wind and in 1980 with Aim for the Heart. These three albums had some jazz influences and were well-produced in the context of other Christian music of the time. Aim for the Heart featured Abraham Laboriel on bass along with Harlan Rogers, Hadley Hockensmith and Bill Maxwell and was certainly jazz influenced. Those four went on to become members of Koinonia jazz band from 1982 till about 1990.

Clark is recognized as one of the founding fathers of the Jesus Movement and the contemporary Christian music industry. During his 13-year association with Word Records in the 1970s and 1980s, Clark's songwriting, record producing and performances placed him in the forefront along with artists like Phil Keaggy, 2nd Chapter of Acts, Love Song, Larry Norman, Andraé Crouch, Honeytree, Keith Green, Randy Stonehill, Barry McGuire, and many notable others.

Discography
 Songs from the Savior, Vol. 1 1972
 Songs from the Savior, Vol. 2 1972
 Come Into His Presence (Paul Clark and Friends) 1974
 Good To Be Home (Paul Clark and Friends) 1975
 Hand to the Plow 1976
 Change in the Wind 1978
 Aim for the Heart 1980
 New Horizon 1981
 Drawn to the Light 1982
 Out of the Shadow 1983
 Awakening from the Western Dream 1988
 When the Moon is Behind the Clouds 1992
 Private World 1995
 Resonate 1996
 Christmas 1998
 Call of the Canyon 2001
 Approaching Jerusalem 2009
 Down at the Whistle Stop 2014
 Branching Roots  2016

References

External links
 
[ Partial list of Clark's musical works]

American performers of Christian music
American male singers
Musicians from Kansas City, Missouri
Living people
Singers from Missouri
Year of birth missing (living people)